Bytnica  (German Beutnitz) is a village in Krosno Odrzańskie County, Lubusz Voivodeship, in western Poland. It is the seat of the gmina (administrative district) called Gmina Bytnica.

The village has a population of 1,200.

References

Bytnica